Guwakuchi or Guakuchi is a village near Nalbari town in India.It is a beautiful village with paddy fields and a natural environment away from the hustle and bustle of the city. People of different religions live there harmoniously.

Importance
This ancient village is known for discovery of copper plate inscriptions of Kamarupa Kings of Pala line, especially of Indra Pala.

See also
 Varman Dynasty
 Villages of Nalbari District

References

Archaeological sites in Kamrup region
Villages in Nalbari district